Traugott Herr (16 September 1890 – 13 April 1976) was a German general during World War II who commanded the 14th Army and the 10th Army of the Wehrmacht. He was a recipient of the Knight's Cross of the Iron Cross with Oak Leaves and Swords.

Early life
Born in 1890, Herr joined the army of Imperial Germany in 1911 as an Fahnen-junker (officer cadet) in the infantry. Serving in the Wehrmacht of Nazi Germany in the late 1930s, he commanded the 3rd Battalion of the 33rd Infantry Regiment.

World War II
Herr commanded an infantry regiment, part of the 13th Motorized Infantry Division, from 8 September 1939 to 14 October 1940, taking part in the Invasion of Poland (September 1939) and France (May 1940 to October 1940). In October 1940, the division was reformed in Vienna as 13th Panzer Division. Herr was given command of 13th Rifle Brigade, which controlled the division's two infantry regiments, on 14 October 1940.

In the invasion of Poland, the division used civilians as human shields in the battle with the retreating Polish Prusy Army and on 8 September 1939 attacked a medical column marked with the Red Cross signs near Odrzywół. A day later, soldiers from the division took part in the revenge killing of 11 civilians and two Polish priests including Dean Stanisław Klimecki in the nearby town of Drzewica in retaliation for their own military losses. Killings have also been reported in nearby settlements of Gielniów, Kamienna Wola, Klwów, Ossa, Przysucha, Potok, Rozwady and Zarzęcin.

In May 1941 the regiment returned to Germany to take part in Operation Barbarossa, the invasion of the Soviet Union, as part of 1st Panzergruppe under Paul Ludwig Ewald von Kleist in Army Group South. In December 1941, Herr was given acting command of 13th Panzer Division.

On 31 October 1942, on the Terek River deep in the Caucasus, Herr suffered a serious head wound, being struck by shrapnel, and was repatriated to Germany to recuperate. He was later appointed commander of the LXXVI Panzer Corps stationed in France; in August 1943 it was sent to Italy. In Italy, his unit faced the British Eighth Army in Calabria, and the U.S. Fifth Army in Salerno.

Herr commanded the corps in the Italian Campaign until 24 November 1944. He also temporarily took command of 14th Army for a brief period from late November to mid-December 1944. On 18 December 1944, he was awarded the Swords to the Knight's Cross. On 15 February 1945 he took command of 10th Army. The Allies final and decisive spring 1945 offensive in Italy opened in early April, Herr was defending the Adriatic sector with orders to hold the lines.  On 2 May 1945 the 14th army was overrun by British forces, and Herr was taken prisoner. He was never charged for the war crimes committed in the east and was released in April 1948.

Awards
 Wound Badge in Black
 Iron Cross (1914) 2nd Class (14 September 1914) & 1st Class (21 October 1915)
 House Order of Hohenzollern with Swords
 Bavarian Military Merit Cross (3rd Class)
 Panzer Badge in Silver
 Clasp to the Iron Cross (1939) 2nd Class (24 September 1939) 1st Class (12 May 1940)
 Knight's Cross of the Iron Cross with Oak Leaves and Swords
 Knight's Cross on 2 October 1941 as Oberst and commander of 13th Rifle Brigade (13. Schützen-Brigade)
 110th Oak Leaves on 9 August 1942 as Generalmajor and commander of 13th Panzer Division (13. Panzer-Division)
 117th Swords on 18 December 1944 as General der Panzertruppe and commanding general of LXXVI Panzer Corps (LXXVI. Panzerkorps)

References

Citations

Bibliography

 
 
 
 
 
 

1890 births
1976 deaths
People from Oebisfelde-Weferlingen
Generals of Panzer Troops
People from the Province of Saxony
Recipients of the Knight's Cross of the Iron Cross with Oak Leaves and Swords
Reichswehr personnel
Military personnel from Saxony-Anhalt
German Army personnel of World War I
German Army generals of World War II